José Antonio Ramírez Lozano (Badajoz, Spain, 5th January 1950) is a Spanish author. He won the Spanish Premio Azorín literary award for his 1984 novel Gárgola, and the Spanish Premio de literary award in 2009.

References

1950 births
Living people